Nostocarboline is a beta-carboline isolated from freshwater cyanobacterium.

References

Beta-Carbolines
Halogen-containing alkaloids
Chloroarenes
Quaternary ammonium compounds